Michael Anthony Ramos (born January 29, 1991) is a Puerto Rican international footballer who currently plays for the Tacoma Stars in the Major Arena Soccer League.

Career

College
Ramos began his career at Walla Walla Community College before transferring to Seattle University where he made 17 appearances for the Redhawks and tallied two goals and five assists in 2011.  After the 2011 season, he stepped away from the game for a couple years due to personal reasons.  In 2014, Ramos decided to reenroll in school and attend Whitworth University.  In his only season with the Pirates, he made 21 appearances and led the team with 12 goals and 10 assists.

Professional
On January 20, 2015, Ramos was drafted in the third round (50th overall) of the 2015 MLS SuperDraft by Toronto FC.  Despite an impressive preseason, he was unable to sign with the club after contract negotiations fell through.

On May 9, Ramos joined PDL side Kitsap Pumas.  He made his debut a week later in a 2–0 victory over Lane United FC.  On June 25, Ramos, along with Nick Hamer and Hiroki Kobayashi, was loaned to USL club Seattle Sounders FC 2.  He made his professional debut that same night in a 1–0 victory over Real Monarchs.

On March 7, 2017, Ramos was announced as a new player for Puerto Rico Football Club that currently plays in the North American Soccer League.

International
Ramos made his debut with the Puerto Rico National football team in September 2016 on three Friendly games against Dominican Republic and India. The following month he played on the Caribbean Cup and scored his first goal against Curaçao in a match where Puerto Rico lost and failed to reach the CONCACAF Gold Cup.

International goals
Scores and results list Puerto Rico's goal tally first.

References

External links
Whitworth University bio
Seattle U bio

1991 births
Living people
Sportspeople from Spokane, Washington
Puerto Rican footballers
American soccer players
American people of Puerto Rican descent
Whitworth Pirates men's soccer players
Kitsap Pumas players
Tacoma Defiance players
Puerto Rico FC players
Association football forwards
Soccer players from Washington (state)
Toronto FC draft picks
USL League Two players
USL Championship players
North American Soccer League players
Puerto Rico international footballers
Seattle Redhawks men's soccer players
Walla Walla Community College alumni
Major Arena Soccer League players
National Premier Soccer League players